South Eastern Freeway is a  freeway in South Australia (SA). It is a part of the National Highway network linking  the state capital cities of Adelaide, SA, and Melbourne, Victoria. It is signed as the M1. It  carries traffic over the Adelaide Hills between Adelaide and the River Murray, near Murray Bridge, where it is connected via the Swanport Bridge to the Dukes Highway, which is the main road route to Victoria. 

It was formerly signposted as Princes Highway, which refers to the coastal route from Adelaide to Sydney via Melbourne.

It is often referred to by South Australians simply as the Freeway, as it was the first freeway in South Australia, and is still the longest, and the only one with "Freeway" in its name rather than "Expressway" or "Highway".  The South Eastern Freeway includes  twin-tube tunnels, the Heysen Tunnels, in the descent towards Adelaide, the first of their kind on the National Highway.

Route
South Eastern Freeway starts at the intersection with Glen Osmond Road, Cross Road and Portrush Road in Glen Osmond. It heads southeast as a six-lane, dual-carriageway route. It travels across the Adelaide Hills. It goes through a hill, via the Heysen Tunnels. 

The freeway is a major freight route. It has arrester beds and concrete median barriers, with street lighting between Glen Osmond and Crafers. 

The freeway narrows to four lanes just before it bypasses Crafers. It continues in a south-easterly direction, past Stirling, Hahndorf and Mount Barker, before narrowing further to a two-lane, single-carriageway. It crosses the Murray River over the Swanport Bridge, and ends just east of the crossing in Long Flat, south-east of Murray Bridge.

History
Prior to the initial construction of the freeway in the 1960s, inbound and outbound road traffic between Adelaide and south-eastern South Australia or Victoria used a two-lane highway originally built in the early part of the 20th century. With growth in Adelaide's population, issues of congestion and safety mandated reconstruction. Studies began in 1962 for a freeway commencing from Crafers, that endpoint selected arguably due to the massive expenditure required with the precedent upgrade of the Mount Barker Road.

Road construction began in 1965 from Crafers. The first stage of eastbound traffic lanes were opened in 1967. The first westbound section opened in 1969. The freeway was opened in stages as construction progressed. The final section bypassing the town of Murray Bridge and connecting to the new Swanport Bridge over the River Murray opened in 1979. This provided an alternative to the historic bridge in Murray Bridge.

The Adelaide–Crafers Highway extension came as a much-needed upgrade and replacement to the previous link road, the Mount Barker Road, which had been contoured to the Adelaide Hills, giving rise to many steep turns, ascending a tortuous route. The tightest hairpin turn on the Mount Barker Road was infamous as the Devil's Elbow, often the site of car and semi-trailer accidents.

In May 1995, Prime Minister Paul Keating announced the construction of the new Adelaide-Crafers section. The Heysen Tunnels, named after well-known South Australian artist and benefactor Hans Heysen, were completed in 1998. Construction was completed in early 2000. In March 2000, Prime Minister John Howard opened the new road. It was the largest South Australian road project at that time, costing A$151 million, wholly funded by the Australian Federal Government.

An additional exit was built at Monarto around 1999 to service an expanding commercial zone and the Monarto Zoo in the area. Another exit was announced in 2014 at Bald Hills Road, 4 km southeast of the Mount Barker interchange to service growing housing estates in southern Mount Barker and Nairne. Bardavcol started construction in May 2015, with the interchange including entry and exit ramps in both directions. The $27M project was funded $16M by the Australian government, $8M from South Australia and $3M from Mount Barker district council. The new interchange opened in August 2016.

The Freeway bypasses many towns previously along the Princes Highway, including:

 Eagle On The Hill
 Crafers
 Stirling
 Aldgate
 Bridgewater
 Verdun
 Hahndorf
 Mount Barker
 Littlehampton
 Nairne
 Kanmantoo
 Callington
 Monarto
 Murray Bridge

Road safety
Shortly after the Adelaide-Crafers section opened, several incidents involving semi-trailers drew media attention to the road. The new freeway has a sustained continuous gradient with traffic lights at the bottom. Heavy vehicles with inadequate braking find it hard to slow down once they exceed a certain speed. This is made worse with brake failures. 

It took some time, and the addition of several warning signs prior to the descent, for heavy vehicles to become familiar with the freeway's characteristics. Semi-trailers can be seen travelling as slow as 20–30 km/h downhill. In 2005, changeable electronic road signs were installed every 200 metres, so that the speed limit of the road can be adjusted from Transport SA headquarters in Adelaide. This has both improved safety for commuters, and emergency service workers like the Country Fire Service.

In 2010 and 2011, after more incidents involving trucks having problems successfully braking down the hill, including one going into a bus stop, and another going straight through the intersection at the bottom, the government added new laws. Any vehicle with 5 axles or more must stay in the left lane, and must not exceed a 60 km/h limit from the interchange at Crafers to the old tollhouse. More safety cameras were installed in an attempt to ensure trucks abide by this new limit.

Additional signs for the two arrester beds on the descent have been added, to encourage out of control drivers to use them as a safer alternative.

In August 2014, another truck descending the hills collided with cars at the intersection of Glen Osmond Road. Two people were killed. A driver of a sewage truck lost control after passing the arrestor beds. The driver was a new employee, who had never driven a manual truck before, and had never driven any vehicle on this segment of road. 

Driver Darren Hicks was seriously injured and testified against employer Cleanaway at a criminal trial after being granted immunity. The prosecution, brought by Comcare, heard that the brakes on the vehicle were defective. In 2021 Cleanaway was convicted of eight charges under health and safety legislation.

Connections
The Adelaide end of the South Eastern Freeway leads downhill to traffic lights at the intersection of Glen Osmond Road. It continues northwest as route number A1 into the Adelaide city centre. It connects north to Portrush Road to bypass the city and go towards Port Adelaide. It connects west onto Cross Road, towards the southern suburbs of Adelaide.

The southeastern end of the freeway, near Murray Bridge, feeds onto the Swanport Bridge, a two-lane,  bridge over the River Murray. It joins the Princes Highway, a dual-carriageway highway to Tailem Bend. At this point, Highway 1 becomes a two-laned, two-way scenic route which passes through many coastal towns of South Australia and Victoria. The National Highway continues to Melbourne as the Dukes Highway (A8) from Tailem Bend to the Victorian border and beyond as the Western Highway.

Exits and intersections

Gallery

See also

 Highway 1 (Australia)
 Highway 1 (South Australia)
 Highways in Australia
 Highways in South Australia
 Freeways in Australia
 Freeways in South Australia
 Metropolitan Adelaide Transport Study

References

External links
Ozroads: South Eastern Freeway

Highways in South Australia
Roads in Adelaide
Freeways and highways in Adelaide
Highway 1 (Australia)